is a Japanese footballer who plays for Kagoshima United FC.

Club statistics
Updated to 23 February 2020.

References

External links

Profile at Roasso Kumamoto

1989 births
Living people
Chuo University alumni
Association football people from Kumamoto Prefecture
Japanese footballers
J2 League players
J3 League players
Roasso Kumamoto players
Kagoshima United FC players
Association football goalkeepers